"Evolution" is a song recorded by Japanese recording artist and lyricist Ayumi Hamasaki, released on January 31, 2001, as the second single from her fourth studio album I Am... (2002).

"Evolution" is a pop rock song that utilizes other genres including alternative rock and pop ballad. The song was fully written and composed by Hamasaki herself, under her penned alias Crea. Lyrically, the song talks about happy and sad moments in life. Upon the song's release, "Evolution" received favorable reviews from most music critics who commended the song's musical production and lyrical content, while Hamasaki's vocal delivery received criticism.

Commercially, the song was a commercial success. The song peaked at number one on the Oricon Singles Chart, making it her eighth number one single. After selling over 950,000 units in Japan, the song was certified million by the Record Industry Association of Japan (RIAJ) for shipments of one million units. The song has sold over one million units worldwide. An accompanying music video was shot by Wataru Takeishi for the single version, which featured Hamasaki inside a televised studio, singing and dancing in front of a live band.

Background
On New Year's Day 2002, Hamasaki had released her fourth studio album I am.... During the album process, Hamasaki had learned about the breaking news of the September 11 attacks in 2001, that had hit New York City and the Washington, D.C., metropolitan area. The attack itself had killed over 2,996 people and caused at least $10 billion in property and infrastructure damage. Because of this, Hamasaki had sought a new inspiration for her then-forthcoming album; instead of writing songs about confusion, loneliness and love like her previous efforts, she was encouraged to engage in more peaceful and worldly themes. The response was positively received from the Japanese audience and became successful in her native Japan; over 2.3 million units in Japan were sold, and the track was certified triple million by the Recording Industry Association of Japan (RIAJ) for shipments of three million copies.

To promote the album, Hamasaki had released the album's lead single "M". Her first single to have been composed and written together by her, the single received favorable reception from most music critics and achieved huge success in Japan; the song peaked at number one and sold over one million units in Japan by RIAJ. To follow up on the success off the single, "Evolution" was selected as the album's second official single in Japan.

Composition and release
"Evolution" was written by Hamasaki herself, like the rest off the I Am... album and produced by long-time collaborator Max Matsuura. "Evolution" was one out of twelve songs on the parent album to have been composed by her, which was first asserted on "M" after her staff failed to compose a musical composition that she had felt conformable with or suited her songs. The song's arrangement was handled by HΛL, who contributed to arranging the songs "M" and "Unite!" on the parent album. Musically, the song incorporates several genres including alternative rock and ballad music, which was heavily compared towards another album track "Unite!". The song starts with a "ballad-inspired intro" that was noted as "deceiving" and features Hamasaki "singing way too fast in her choruses"

For the cover artwork, the sleeve was shot by Shinichi Hara, art design was handled by Shigeru Kasai and was officially directed by Yasuyuki Tomita. The cover artwork features Hamasaki holding a microphone and features the text of the single name inprinted with the American flag inside it. The CD single off "Evolution" was released on January 31, 2001, by Avex Trax and was eventually released digitally worldwide. In addition towards the physical release, the single was served on a vinyl release by Rhythm Republic records in Japan, a bonus DVD release and also released a limited edition VHS tape.

Reception

Critical reception
"Evolution" received favorable reviews from most music critics. Jeff from Random.Access.Reviews had compared both "Evolution" and "Unite!" for sharing similar music structures. He commented "["UNITE!"] brings more J-Rock to the forefront, as does ["Evolution"], eventually sounding just like each other [...]" Jeff commented that while the choruses were too fast and powerful, he did conclude "evolution" is a bit more catchy and poppy though, so I'll recommend that one." Greenberg, who had written the extended biography of Hamasaki on the same website, had listed "Evolution" as one of her career standouts. Hamasaki had hosted an online voting poll for fans to choose their favorite tracks to be featured on her Ayumi Hamasaki 15th Anniversary Tour ~Best Live Tour~. As a result, all three songs from H were featured on the list.

Commercial response
Commercially, the song was a success. "Evolution" debuted at number one on the Oricon Singles Chart, which became Hamasaki's eighth number one in Japan since her 1999 single "Love: Destiny" which became her first number one. During the same charting week, Hamasaki's single "M" was at number eight. During the singles second charting week, it fell to number three, being stalled by KinKi Kids' single "Boku no Senaka ni wa Hane ga Aru" and Kuraki Mai's single "Tsumetai Umi/Start in My Life" at number one and two respectively, and had stalled at number three for two consecutive weeks. The song stayed inside the top forty for eleven weeks, and fell to number forty-five in its twelfth week. The song had left the top fifty and the singles last charting position was at number 100 on its seventeenth week. Two other of Hamasaki's singles featured on that last week, which were "Unite!" and "Endless sorrow".

"Evolution" sold over 950,000 units in Japan and was certified Million by the Recording Industry Association of Japan for shipments off one million units within the country. The song was also certified gold by RIAJ for more than 100,000 legal downloads in July 2014, which equivalently tallies the sales to over one million sales in Japan, as of July 2014. "Evolution" became Hamasaki's best selling single in 2001 onwards until it was surpassed by her 2002 EP H, which also charted at number one and was the only release in 2002 to sell over one million units. As of today, "Evolution" is Hamasaki's sixth best selling single in her musical career just behind H at five, "Boys & Girls" at four, "M" at three, "Seasons" at two and "A" at one.

In 2014, "Evolution" had charted on the Japan Billboard Adult Alternative chart at number 70, thirteen years later after the singles release.

Music video
The music video starts with Ayu being driven to the video shoot for "Evolution". Upon arrival, she is helped out of the limo by her bodyguard. Throughout the video, both filming and music production equipment can be seen. At various points, Ayu can be seen dancing while singing into a wireless microphone; there are also points in the video where she is seen as a hologram, and places in the video where she is seen being directed by the on-set director and given touch-ups throughout filming. There are also parts in the video where various staff members, such as film crew, other staff members—including a band used for the video.

Promotion
Evolution was used in a TV ad for a Kose Visee mascara featuring Ayumi herself.

Track listing

Single
Evolution "Original Mix" - 4:42
Evolution "Dub's Floor Remix Transport 004" - 7:38
Evolution "DJ Remo-Con Remix" - 8:44
End of the World "Laugh & Peace Mix" - 6:54
Evolution "Boom Bass Ayumix" - 4:06
Evolution "Oriental Hot Spa" - 7:18
Surreal "Nicely Nice Electron '00 remix" - 5:02
Evolution "Huge Terrestrial Birth Mix" - 5:22
Evolution "Law Is Q mix" - 7:33
Evolution "Original Mix: Instrumental" - 4:41

Video single
 "Evolution" PV
 "TV-CM SPOT"
 "~Making of - Off shot flash~"

Live performances 
February 2, 2001 - Music Station
February 3, 2001 - Count Down TV
February 5, 2001 - Hey! Hey! Hey!
October 6, 2001 - Pop Jam
November 17, 2001 - All Japan Request Awards
December 2, 2001 - Digital Dream Live
December 23, 2008 - Happy Xmas Show!! (with Days)

Charts
Oricon Sales Chart (Japan)

 RIAJ certification: 3× Platinum (sold), Million (shipped)

Notes

References

External links
 Evolution information at Avex Network.
 Evolution information at Oricon.

Ayumi Hamasaki songs
2001 songs
2001 singles
Oricon Weekly number-one singles
Songs written by Ayumi Hamasaki
Japanese film songs